The Wenham Historic District is a predominantly rural and residential historic district in Wenham, Massachusetts.  It encompasses the full length of Main Street (Massachusetts Route 1A) between the Beverly and Hamilton lines, a stretch of one of the original post roads which is known to have elements of its present alignment as early as 1710.  The architecture along the route is predominantly residential, principally excepting the cluster of municipal and religious buildings in the town center.  Most of the buildings in the district were built in the 18th and 19th centuries.

The district was listed on the National Register of Historic Places in 1973.

See also
National Register of Historic Places listings in Essex County, Massachusetts

References

Historic districts in Essex County, Massachusetts
Buildings and structures in Wenham, Massachusetts
National Register of Historic Places in Essex County, Massachusetts
Historic districts on the National Register of Historic Places in Massachusetts